Yann Aime Kasaï (born 14 April 1998) is a Swiss football player who plays as forward for Biel-Bienne in the third-tier Swiss Promotion League.

Club career
On 5 December 2018, Kasaï joined FC Zürich. made his professional debut for Zürich in a 2–0 Swiss Super League loss to FC Basel on 9 December 2018.

On 13 July 2021, he signed with Dornbirn in Austria. He was released from the contract on 3 January 2022.

On 13 June 2022, Kasaï moved to Biel-Bienne on a one-season deal.

International career
On 15 November 2018, Kasaï scored for Switzerland U20 against Netherland U20 (result 1-3)

Personal life
Kasaï was born in Switzerland and is of Congolese descent.

References

External links
 
 SFV U20 Profile
 SFL Profile
 SAFP Profile
 
 FCZ Profile

1998 births
Swiss people of Democratic Republic of the Congo descent
People from Neuchâtel
Living people
Swiss men's footballers
Switzerland youth international footballers
Association football forwards
BSC Young Boys players
Breitenrain Bern players
FC Zürich players
Étoile Carouge FC players
FC Dornbirn 1913 players
FC Biel-Bienne players
2. Liga (Austria) players
Swiss Promotion League players
Swiss Super League players
Swiss expatriate footballers
Expatriate footballers in France
Expatriate footballers in Italy
Expatriate footballers in Austria
Swiss expatriate sportspeople in France
Swiss expatriate sportspeople in Italy
Swiss expatriate sportspeople in Austria
Sportspeople from the canton of Neuchâtel